John Rinehart (born 1970) is the President of Business Operations for the Sacramento Kings and Golden 1 Center since July 2017.

Rinehart is on the board of the Sacramento Chapter of the Positive Coaching Alliance, Sacramento Convention & Visitors Bureau, and the Sacramento Kings Foundation. Rinehart and his two daughters reside in the Land Park neighborhood of Downtown Sacramento.

Early life and career 
Rinehart attended Villanova University (1987–91), and earned a Bachelor of Science degree in Accounting.

Before his job with the Kings, Rinehart worked for the Anaheim Angels & Anaheim Ducks (1998-2000) as Director of Finance at Anaheim Sports, and served as Manager of Financial Reporting for the San Francisco Giants (1996–98). Before entering the sports profession, Rinehart worked for PricewaterhouseCoopers (1991–96) in San Francisco.

Sacramento Kings 
Starting in the 2000-01 season, Rinehart became the chief executive officer.

During this time, Rinehart oversaw the financial accounting and business operations of the Sacramento Kings and Sleep Train Arena. Also, Rinehart was directly involved in the construction of the Kings' new arena. Additionally, Rinehart's duties included contract negotiation, legal issues, arena services, player contract compliance, strategic planning, insurance and tax requirements. Arena services included the supervision of the retail sales, human resources, ticket services and box office operations. In his time with the Kings, Rinehart has negotiated agreements on building naming rights, ticketing agreements, debt financing, and cable/radio broadcast contracts such as the Comcast Sports Net deal.

In 2013, Rinehart negotiated the sale of the Kings between the former owner Maloof family and the group led by Vivek Ranadivé. Despite the new ownership, Ranadivé asked Rinehart to remain with the team as EVP of business operations and CFO.

In 2017, Rinehart was instrumental in securing construction financing for a $1 billion strategic investment to develop Golden 1 Center and Downtown Commons(DOCO).

In July 2017, Rinehart was promoted from CFO to president of business operations, following the resignation of president Chris Granger after four years with the team.

In September 2017, the Golden 1 Center won the Sacramento Business Environmental Resource Center 2017 Sustainable Business Award for Energy Conservation, and was chosen as one of the region's Best Real Estate Projects by the Sacramento Business Journal. Rinehart said, “Golden 1 Center is much more than a basketball arena...We wanted to create a platform that shared the hard-work of the region, sparked a new vision for the region, and elevated the standards of how sports teams and businesses should engage with their community and the world.”

On October 24, 2020, the Golden 1 Center opened as the largest voting center in Sacramento County during the 2020 election. Rinehart said the organization spoke to elections officials with the proposal, which made their arena the first professional sports venue in California to announce plans to serve as a voting location. "Trying to make it as easy as possible for people to come and really exercise one of their most important rights as American citizens," Rinehart said.

In response to the COVID-19 pandemic, the Kings fired approximately 100 employees starting June 1, 2021. "We delayed this for as long as possible, but, unfortunately, the harsh economic realities facing the live sports and entertainment industries were just too much to overcome," Rinehart said.

In January 2021, the Kings rolled out new audio technology to improve real-time radio access for fans.  Rinehart said the deal with startup Mixhalo would offer an audio experience “more immersive than ever before” when fans attend games. In February 2021, the Kings launched Intel True View at Golden 1 Center to enhance the media fan experience, giving fans access to special video content such as 360-degree highlights. Rinehart said, “We are excited to bring our fans closer to the game through engaging highlights that place them at the center of the action on the court."

See also 
List of National Basketball Association team presidents

References

Living people
Sacramento Kings executives
1970 births